Sui Jianguo, professor and ex-chairman of the Department of Sculpture in Central Academy of Fine Arts in Beijing, is a contemporary Chinese artist.

Biography
Sui was born in Qingdao, China in 1956.  Both of his parents were factory workers and were largely absent during his early childhood due to the workload imposed on them by the Mao government.  Growing up, Sui witnessed the harsh realities of the Mao years.  During this time Maoist socialist realism became the approved art style.   This style generally portrayed Maoist ideals in a romantic positive light.  These images were used to create a cult of personality for Mao.   At the age of ten, schools were closed as part of the Cultural Revolution, and Sui began to work in the factories with his parents.  In an interview he stated that he was “transfixed in the age of Mao worship, when Mao was virtually a God at home”.   Painting was not a career option for Sui until the age of eighteen when he broke his arm, which took him away from factory work.  According to Sui, during this period he contemplated his “spiritual” life and what he wanted to do with his future.  Soon after, and with the permission and guidance of his father, he began studying painting at night under the cover of darkness.

Upon his return to the factory Sui painted propaganda posters of Mao in the socialist realist fashion. His studies and practice gave fruit to his first true work: a traditional Chinese landscape painting, which he completed in 1976 after the death of Mao.  After his death, the Chinese government loosened its grip on the population, and educational reforms were quick to follow.  Sui took advantage of the new freedoms, and moved to Jinan and then Shandong, where he received his major in sculpture. A few years later he earned his master's degree in Arts at the central Academy of Fine Arts in Beijing.    According to Sui, by the time he had enrolled in college, he had decided he wanted to do sculpture, inspired by his years in the factories, where people would tell him he had “skill in using his hands”.  After gaining his master's degree, Sui travelled to the Netherlands, Australia, Japan, and other places to display his art.  He also worked as a guest professor or speaker at several universities outside of China.  Finally, Sui returned to become chairman of the department of sculpture at the Central Academy of Fine Arts.

Sui became internationally prominent through the use of “naturalistic sculptures” that made use of rocks, boulders, and steel.  These early sculptures brought him into the international scene.  His true acclaim came in 1997 when he crafted his first Mao suit, a sculpture that imitated Chairman Mao's communist jacket.  His jackets interested famous collectors such as Uli Sigg, and helped him gain international recognition.

Art
Sui has been an active artist on the stage of modern and contemporary art in China.  He has had numerous solo and joint exhibitions in Japan, Australia, Hong Kong, India, Taiwan, and most recently in the United States, in addition to his active schedules in China, and several high-profile exhibitions worldwide.  He likes to work with hard and heavy materials such as granite and metals.  His techniques of sealing, binding, tying and hammering created a relationship of association and confrontation between his materials, which resonate with his perception of life and his internal conflicts.  Among his known works in the early 1990s are Land Depression, in which he entwines huge boulders in nets made from steel ropes, and Sealed Memory, a closely welded cabinet of thick steel sheets, which gives an oppressive sense of weight and blockage. Memory is a wall made out of old railroad ties. The ties have been ground down just as humans are ground down by life, and they become part of a dividing wall, a boundary.

Many of Sui's early works reflect his personal experiences and explore, to a lesser or greater extent, and his anxieties and feelings of imprisonment. He began his Mao Suit series in 1997. This series can be regarded as the conclusion of an important stage in his self-exploration. He draws on the powerful image of the Mao suit, not as an element of revolutionary attire but as a symbol of restriction and limitation. Sui suggests that none of the Chinese have truly taken off their Mao suits even though the revolutionary era is over. Sometimes Sui makes the Mao suits resemble Buddhas and at other times he turns them into hard shells. Recently, Sui has made fairly humorous, soft and almost transparent Mao suits. The Mao suit is perhaps coming to represent to the artist an object of fun.

In a more recent work, the red dinosaur, a symbol of imperialist China, like communist China, with the engraved door on the chest mentions "Made in China". This is a glance toward plastic toys from the start of the Chinese economic flight, and a symbol of an antiquated China moving toward being contemporary. Throughout the 1960s, it seemed that everything was "made in Japan", in the 1970s "made in Taiwan", and in the 1980s "made in China". The fabrication of finished products based on models and imported raw materials has become the economic norm of emerging countries.

Over all, Sui's work has well represented the views and expressions of his generation, the generation that survived Mao's Cultural Revolution. More importantly, as one of the most active and most productive artists in China today, and as the head of the department in the most prestigious art institute in China, he has brought fundamental changes to the contemporary art movement in recent China. Because of his influential works and through his educational efforts, abstract and conceptual sculpture have been well accepted by the ordinary Chinese people and by the authorities. Furthermore, he has taken the role of bringing the contemporary art of modern China to the world. His works have been well recognized by the Western art world.

Famous works
While Sui Jianguo is a prolific artist, certain of his works have stood out.  Not only have these allowed Sui to become a prominent contemporary Chinese artist, but they also grant viewers an insight into his mind and opinions.

Earth Force

Earth Force was one of Sui's earlier works and came to his mind in 1987.  The inspiration came when he was experimenting with conceptual and symbolic aspects of materials and mediums.  His need to experiment with rocks came after Tiananmen Square; it was during this stage that Sui began working with more quiet materials.  Earth Force consists of twenty 100 kg boulders.  Each boulder is entangled in a web of ribbed steel.  The final work was presented in Beijing in 1992.

Mao Jackets

Sui Jianguo's Mao Jackets are perhaps his most iconic work.  Sui began thinking of the Mao Suit or Sun Yat Sen suit when he visited the birthplace of Sun Yat Sen in August 1996.  A finished product finally emerged a year later when Sui was in Australia for a fellowship.  A “scholarly discussion” is credited with yielding the first outlines or frame of the suit.

While there are several representations of these jackets, most of them are a hollow sculpture of a Mao suit.  Sue Wang states that “utilizing various forms and sizes to simultaneously release the excitement and inhibition associated with this object, the artist used a satirical approach to express the conflict between escape and repression”.

The Mao suit itself is representative of Sui's strong ties with China's Maoist past.  During the Cultural Revolution Sui and many other Chinese were influenced by Mao's cult of personality.  Sui goes into further detail, stating “Mao was virtually a God at home”.   The empty, hollow suits are seen by some as symbols of Mao's empty promises.  Sui stresses that the suits are not much as a criticism but more of a medium to convey his ideas and emotions about his Maoist past.  Upon completion of this project Sui felt like he had reached a certain type of resolution.  Sui claimed, “I’m putting him to rest.  This way I can grow up”.

Red Dinosaurs

Sui's Red Dinosaurs or Jurassic Age series have also become a trademark of his work.  These dinosaurs focus more on China's recent exporting nature, allowing Sui to evaluate the contemporary Chinese export culture.  According to 798 ART district, the “Made in China” stamped on several of the dinosaurs' midsection “relates directly to some topics on economical relations”.  Sui intends to cause the audience to consider who is making a product, where it is going, and why. Sui sometimes cages the dinosaurs. When asked about this, Sui stated that he was suggesting that China's economic expanse "in some ways is not good for China, for the environment and human life... I don't want him to continue getting bigger".

The dinosaurs are usually made out of fiberglass and can stand up to 310 cm tall.

Made in China

Sui's Made in China series revolves around China's new identity as a world producing power.  The works are usually banners stating "Made in China".

Limited Motion

Some of Sui's most recent work has been on the Limited Motion series. Limited Motion was created in order to express the feelings of “imprisonment” felt by Sui Jianguo.  The series of works made its debut in 2011 and was shown in the Museum Beelden aan Zee in The Hague.

For this series Sui creates steel structures that house steel spheres.  These spheres are able to move due to an internal motor.  As seen with previous works, the works in this series vary in size as well as shape.  For example, one of the Limited Motions is housed in a cage, and another is housed in a box. In the grander scope of the work, however, certain crucial details manifest themselves in the project that allow the artist to fully share his feelings and intentions via the artwork.  The first of these details is the solid unrelenting structures themselves.  Their harsh exterior perhaps refers to the oppressive stance the Chinese government has on censorship.  The exterior shells are weathered, perhaps indicating the attempts made upon the structure to weaken it or tear it down, yet we still see it standing in place.

Solo exhibitions 

2012      "Sui Jianguo's Discus Thrower" The British Museum, London, UK

2012      "Sui Jianguo" Pace Beijing, 798, Beijing, China

2012      "Restrained Power: Sui Jianguo's Work", MOCA, Singapore

2011      “the Hague Under Heaven---Suijianguo Sculpture” Museum Beelden aan Zee, Hague, Holland

2010      “Made in China by Sui Jianguo” Art Issue Projects, Beigao District, Beijing, China

2009      “Motion/Tension : New Work by SuiJianguo", Today Art Museum, Beijing, China

2008      “Art Time Square-Exhibition of works by Sui Jianguo”, Hong Kong, China

2008      “Revealing Traces”, Joyart, Beijing, China

2007      “Dian Xue - Sui Jianguo Art Works”, OCAT, Shanghai, China

2007      “Speeding up – Sui Jianguo Space Video”, Arario, Beijing, China

2005      “Sui Jianguo: The Sleep of Reason”, Asian Art Museum, San Francisco, US

1999      “Clothes Veins Study”, Passage Gallery, Beijing, China

1997     “You Meet the Shadow of Hundred Years”, Victoria College of the Arts, Melbourne, Australia

1996      “Exhibition of Works by Sui Jianguo”, Hanart Gallery, Hong Kong

1995      “Deposit and Fault”, New Delhi Culture Center, India

1994      “Exhibition of Works by Sui Jianguo”, Hanart Gallery, Taipei, Taiwan

1994      “Remembrance of Space”, CAFA Gallery, Beijing, China

2013      "Space Drawings" "FITUNFIT", Museum KAdE, Amersfoort, Holland

2011      “Leaving Realism Behind”, Pace Beijing, Beijing, China

2011      “Start from the Horizon-Chinese Contemporary Sculpture Since 1978”, Sishang Art Museum, Beijing, China

2011      “Ideology and Manifestation”, Wenxuan Art Museum, Chengdu, China

2011      “the 4th Guangdong Triennial”, GMOA, China

2011      “Super-Organism-CAFAM Biennale", Beijing, China

2011      “Collection History-China New Art”, MOCA, Chengdu, China

2011      “Martell Artists of the Year” Beijing, Shanghai, Guangzhou

2010      “Made in Pop Land”, National Museum of Contemporary Art, Korea

2010      “The city of forking paths” The sculpture project of the expo boulevard, World Expo Shanghai 2010, 
Shanghai

2010      “The constructed dimension - 2010 Chinese contemporary art invitational exhibition” National Art 
Museum of China

2010      “Sculpture - Sui Jianguo and his students”, A4 gallery, Chengdu, China

2009      “The home court” White Box Museum of Art, 798, Beijing, China

2009      “Beijing—Havana The Revolution of Art”, The National Museum of Fine Arts, Havana, Cuba

2009      “I Can Believe Chinese Contemporary Artist’s" (Invitation) Exhibition & Star Art Museum Opening 
Exhibition

2009      “Embrace Suzhou - Exhibition of Chinese Contemporary Art”, Suzhou Art Museum, China

2009      “09 Art Changsha” Hunan Museum, Changsha, China

2009      Conversation With Chinese Contemporary Sculpture, Millennium Park, Chicago, US

2009      State Legacy-Research in the visualisation of political history, Manchester, MMU, UK

2009      "Spectacle—to each his own", Museum of Contemporary Art, Taipei

2008      “Art and Chinese Revolution”, Asia Society, New York, US

2008      “Beyond-Sotheby’s at Chatsworth”, Chatsworth, UK

2008      “Conciliatory-Bozinan Biennalia”,  Bozinan Art Museum, Poland

2008      “Come Over”, Li Space, Caochangdi, Beijing, China

2008      “Hanging in Sky Drifting on Surface”,  Linda Gallery, 798 Beijing, China

2008      “Reflective Asia—3rd Nanjing Triennial”, Nanjing Museum, Nanjing, China

2008      “Hypallage — The Post - Modem Mode of Chinese Contemporary Art”, The OCT Art & Design Gallery, 
Shenzhen, China

2008      “Half - life of a Dream — Contemporary Chinese Art”, SFMOMA, US

2008      “Ships at Sea” – Henk Visch & Sui Jianguo, C - Space, Beijing, China

2008      “New World Order”, Groninger Museum, Groningen, The Netherlands

2008      “Free Fall”, Chen Ling Hui Contemporary Space, Beijing, China

2008      “Crouching Paper Hidden Dragon”, F2 Gallery, Caochangdi, Beijing, China

2008      “Hunting Birds”, Tang Contemporary, Beijing, China

2007      “Energy—Spirit, Body, Material, The First Today’s Documents 2007”,  Today's Art Museum, Beijing, China

2007      “Forms of Concepts—the reform of concepts of Chinese contemporary Art 1987-2007”, Hubei Art Museum, 
Wu Han, China

2007      “Red Hot - Asian Art Today from the Chaney Family Collection”, the Museum of Fine Arts, Houston, US

2007      “Metamorphosis: The Generation of Transformation in Chinese Contemporary Art “, Tampere Art 
Museum, Finland

2007      “Fashion Accidentally”, Museum of Contemporary Art, Taipei, Taiwan

2007      “What is Monoha?”, B.T.A.P., Beijing, China

2007      “Breathe”, Jinan, China

2007      “Top 10 Chinese Contemporary Sculptors”, Asia Art Center, Beijing, China

2007      “Chinese Contemporary Socart”, The Tretyakov Gallery, Moscow, Russia

2007      “We Are Your Future - Special Project for 2nd Moscow Biennale”, Russia

2006      “City in Progress / Live from Zhang Jiang”, Shanghai, China

2006      “Double - kick Cracker”, Tang Contemporary, Beijing, China

2006      “Susi - Future & Fantasy”, Metropolitan Museum of Manila, The Philippines

2006      “Absolute Images”, Arario Tian, South Korea

2006      “China Trade”, International Center for Contemporary Asian Art, Vancouver, Canada

2006      “Jianghu”, Jack Tilton Gallery, New York, US

2006      “Between Past and Future: New Photography and Video from China”, Haus der Kulturen der Welt, 
Berlin, Germany

2006      “On the Edge”, Davis Museum and Culture Center, Wellesley College, Massachusetts, US

2005      “Beautiful Cynicism”, Arario, Beijing, China

2005      “Ten Thousand Years”, Postmodern City, Beijing, China

2005      “To Each His Own”, Zero-Space 798, Beijing, China

2005      “Xianfeng! Chinese Avant-garde sculpture, Museum Beelden aan Zee, Scheveningen, The Netherlands

2005      “Transportation Box”, Jianwai SOHO, Beijing, China

2005      “On the Edge - Contemporary Chinese Artists Encounter the West”, Cantor Center for Visual Arts, 
Stanford University, California, US

2005      “Between Past and Future: New Photography and Video from China”, Seattle Art Museum, Seattle, US

2004      “Now - Conceptual Estate in Shanghai”, Shanghai, China

2004      “The First Nominative Exhibition of Fine Art Literature”, Wuhan, China

2004      “Sculpture by the Sea”, Sydney, Australia

2004      “Gods Becoming Men”, Frissiras Museum, Athens, Greece

2004      “What Is Art - Two Wrongs Can Make One Right”, Xian Art Museum, Xian, China

2004      “Playing With Chi Energy”, House of Shiseido, Tokyo, Japan

2004      “L’art à la Plage”, Nice, France

2004      “Exposition des Sculptures Chinoises”, Jardin Des Tuileries, Paris, France

2004      “Between Past and Future: New Photography and Video from China”, International Center of 
Photography / Asia Society, New York, US

2004      “Le Moine et le Démon”, Lyon Contemporary Art Museum, Lyon, France

2004      “Busan Sculpture Project”, Busan, South Korea

2004      “Light As Fuck!”, National Museum of Contemporary Art, Oslo, Norway

2004      “Beyond Boundaries”, Shanghai Gallery of Art, Shanghai, China

2003      “Open the Sky: Contemporary Art Exhibition”, Duolun Art Museum, Shanghai, China

2003      “The Sea and the Music: Modern Sculpture Exhibition”, Xiamen, China

2003      “Left Wing”, Left Bank Plaza, Beijing, China

2003      “Conceptual Estate”, Shenzhen, China

2003      “Exhibition of Modern Ceramic Art”, Fushan, China

2003      “Second Reality”, Pingod Space, Beijing, China

2003      “Red Memory - Left Hand and Right Hand”, 798 Art District, Beijing, China

2003      “Today’s Chinese Art”, Shijitan, Beijing, China

2003      “Open Time”, National Art Gallery, Beijing, China

2003      “Contemporary Sculpture - China Korea Japan”, Osaka Museum, Japan

2003      “Beaufort Triennial Contemporary Art by the Sea”, Museum of Modern Art, Oostende, Belgium

2002      “Paris – Pékin”, Palace Cardin, Paris, France

2002      “Mirage”, Suzhou Art Museum, Suzhou, China

2002      “1st Guangzhou Triennial”, Guangdong Art Museum, Guangzhou, China

2002      “Beijing Afloat”, B.T.A.P., Beijing, China

2002      “Made in China”, Wilhelm Lehmbruck Museum, Duisburg, Germany

2002      “Triennial of Chinese Art”, Guangzhou Museum, Guangzhou, China

2002      “Modernity in China - 1980-2002”, Fondacion Armando Alvares Penteado (FAAP), São Paulo, Brazil

2002      “Artists of Ideal”, Contemporary Art Center, Verona, Italy

2002      “Made By Chinese”, Gallery Enrico Navara, Paris, France

2002      “Made in China”, Ethan Cohen Fine Art, New York, US

2001      “Transplantation In Situ”, He Xiangning Art Museum, Shenzhen, China

2001      “Dream 2001 - Contemporary Chinese Art Exhibition”, Red Mansion, London, UK

2001      “Forever”, Canadian Embassy, Beijing, China

2001      “Open 2001- Fourth International Sculpture and Installation”, Venice, Italy

2001      “Art on the Beach”, Nice, France

2001      “Between Earth and Heaven: New Classical Movements in the Art of Today”, Museum Of Modern Art, 
Oostende, Belgium

2000      “Shanghai Spirit - Shanghai Biennale”, Shanghai Art Museum, Shanghai, China

2000      “Sui Jianguo and Zhan Wang”, Galerie Loft, Paris, France

2000      “Sharing Exoticisms - Contemporary Art Lyon Biennale”, Lyon, France

2000      “Chinese Contemporary Sculpture Invitational Exhibition”, Qingdao Sculpture Museum, Qingdao, China

1999      “Second Annual Contemporary Sculpture Exhibition”, He Xiangning Art Museum, Shenzhen, China

1999      “Gate of the Century”, Chengdu Art Museum, Chengdu, China

1999      “Avant-garde in China”, Galerie Loft, Paris, France

1999      “Les Champs de la Sculpture 2000”, Paris, France

1999      “The Fourteenth International Asia Art Exhibition”, Asia Art Museum, Fukuoka, Japan

1999      “Volume and Form - Singapore Art Festival”, Singapore Art Museum, Singapore

1999      “Four Artists”, Beijing Art Warehouse, Beijing, China

1999      “Departure From China”, Beijing Design Museum, Beijing, China

1999      “China 1999”, Limn Gallery, San Francisco, US

1999      “Transience: Chinese Art at the End of the Twentieth Century”, David and Alfred Smart Museum of 
Art, University of Chicago, US

1998      “Personal Touch - Chinese Contemporary Art”, TEDA Contemporary Art Museum, Tianjin, China

1998      “First Annual Contemporary Sculpture Exhibition”, He Xiangning Art Museum, Shenzhen, China

1998      “Im Spiegel der Eigenen Tradition - Contemporary Chinese Art”, German Embassy, Beijing, China

1998      “A Revelation of 20 Years Contemporary Chinese Art”, Forbidden City, Beijing, China

1998      “Vivre Life - Eight Artists Exhibition”, Wan Feng Gallery, Beijing, China

1997      “Dream of China - Chinese Contemporary Art”, Yan Huang Art Museum, Beijing, China

1997      “Continue - Five Sculptors’ Exhibition", CAFA Gallery, Beijing, China

1997      “Sui Jianguo & Li Gang”, Contemporary Chinese Sculpture, Red Gate Gallery, Beijing, China

1997      “A Point of Contact – Korean, Chinese and Japanese Contemporary Art”, Taegu Culture Hall, Taegu, 
Korea

1996      “First Academic Exhibition of Chinese Contemporary Artists,” Hong Kong Art Center, Hong Kong

1996      “Reality, Present, and Future - Chinese Contemporary Art”, Beijing International Art Museum, 
Beijing, China

1996      “From the East of Asia - Installation & Painting”, Kodama Gallery, Osaka, Japan

1996      “Works Nominated by Art Critics (Sculpture and Installation) in Jiangsu Monthly Magazine”, 
Beijing, China

1995      “Women Site”, Beijing Contemporary Art Gallery, Beijing, China

1995      “Plan for Development”, CAFA Gallery, Beijing, China

1995      “From the Middle Kingdom - Chinese Avant-garde Art Since 1979”, Centre d'Art Santa Monica, 
Barcelona, Spain

1994      “Substance and Creativity: Asian Arts and Craft from Its Origin to the Present Day”, Hiroshima, 
Japan

1993      “Sui Jianguo and Wang Keping Sculpture Exhibition”, Chinese Modern Art Center, Osaka, Japan

1993      “China’s New Art post 1989”, Hong Kong Art Center, Hong Kong

1992      “Contemporary Young Sculptors, National Academy of Fine Arts, Hangzhou, China

1992      “Position '92”, CAFA Gallery, Beijing, China

1990    “Exhibition of Art Workshop No.1”, CAFA Gallery, Beijing, China

1986    “Exhibition of Young Artists in Shandong”, Jinan, China

References

External links
 Artnet
 ArtZineChina
 XibArt
 Sui Jianguo, Hadrien de Montferrand Gallery
 BigCrow
 SFGate
 ArtSlant

1956 births
Living people
Chinese contemporary artists
Artists from Qingdao
Educators from Shandong